Murad Inoyatov and Denis Istomin were the defending champions, but only Inoyatov chose to participate this year.
He partnered with Dmitri Sitak, but they were eliminated by Karol Beck and Filip Polášek in the quarterfinal.
Beck and Polášek went to reach the final but lost there to Ross Hutchins and Jamie Murray 6–2, 4–6, [8–10].

Seeds

Draw

Draw

External links
 Main Draw

Tashkent Challenger - Doubles
2010 Doubles